Dany Fortin  is a Canadian Armed Forces officer who holds the rank of major general in the Canadian Army. He has served in commanding roles in the War in Afghanistan and the ISIL insurgency in Iraq, and commanded the 1st Canadian Division Headquarters.  He served as the Public Health Agency of Canada's (PHAC) vice president of logistics and operations from November 27, 2020 to May 14, 2021, leading the federal government's COVID-19 vaccine rollout, but was removed from that role after the Canadian Forces National Investigation Service initiated an investigation into him following an allegation of sexual assault between January 1 and April 30, 1988  while he was a student at Royal Military College Saint-Jean. The investigation resulted in a charge in August 2021 of one count of sexual assault. A judge in a Gatineau, Québec court acquitted Fortin on December 5, 2022.

Military career 
Dany Fortin graduated from the Royal Military College of Canada in 1991 with a Bachelor of Science (Physics), and was commissioned as a 2Lt in the artillery. A variety of staff assignments and appointments followed and from 2007-2009 he commanded 5e Régiment d'Artillerie Légère du Canada, based in Valcartier, Québec. Fortin served a year in Afghanistan (2009-2010) as Chief of Staff Task Force Kandahar, and was then posted to National Defence headquarters in Ottawa as the executive assistant to Chief of the Defence Staff General Walt Natyncyzk (2010-2011).

Fortin was next appointed head of operations for the Canadian Army (2011-2012), and from 2012-2014 served as Commander of 5 Canadian Mechanized Brigade Group. From 2015-2017 he was assigned as Deputy Commanding General (Operations) for I Corps of the United States Army  in Joint Base Lewis-McChord near Tacoma, Washington. Fortin then served as director of operations in the foreign and defence policy secretariat at Canada's Privy Council Office (2017-2018), and subsequently was appointed Commander 1st Canadian Division based in Kingston, Ontario. After just six months in place, he was appointed as the first commander of the new NATO Mission Iraq based in Baghdad (2018-2019), a non-combat advisory and capacity-building mission to prevent the return of Daesh.

Public Health Agency of Canada role 
On return to Canada from the NATO Mission Iraq, Fortin concluded his command in Kingston and was appointed Chief of Staff, Canadian Joint Operations Command in Ottawa. Five months later, in November 2020, Fortin was seconded to PHAC and named vice-president of logistics and operations, playing a lead role in the procurement and distribution of the COVID-19 vaccines approved by Health Canada for the federal COVID-19 vaccine rollout. In this capacity, for several weeks during the global pandemic he appeared on national TV explaining the state and status of vaccine procurement and distribution. On May 14, 2021, the Department of National Defence announced that Fortin was removed from the PHAC assignment pending a military investigation.

On May 17, Fortin was replaced by Brigadier General Krista Brodie. Fortin was temporarily re-assigned to as a senior adviser for Commander Canadian Joint Operations Command in Ottawa, but has been on paid leave since later in 2021.

Sexual assault charge 

In 2021, Fortin was accused of sexually assaulting a sleeping woman in 1988 while he was a student at Royal Military College Saint-Jean in Saint-Jean-sur-Richelieu, Québec. The woman testified that she woke up to find a man masturbating himself using one of her hands while another hand was on a body part. The incident was investigated by the Canadian Forces National Investigation Service. Fortin denied the allegation.

On May 19, the provost marshal said that it had referred the matter to the director of criminal and penal prosecutions in Quebec to decide if charges should be brought. In August 2021, Fortin was charged with one count of sexual assault by Gatineau, Québec police which allegedly occurred while at military college in 1988 between January 1 and April 30. He was acquitted by a judge on December 5, 2022. 

In his ruling, Judge Richard Meredith concluded the complainant was sincere in her belief that she was assaulted but noted several significant inconsistencies with her testimony, and cited numerous factors that could easily have lead to mistaken identity the night in question. In a statement to media post-ruling, Fortin reiterated his innocence and that in his view from the start, senior military and political decision-makers presumed and acted as if he was guilty - thereby denying him due process, and mishandling as well as leaking information about his case. Fortin noted he would take time to process the ruling and with his lawyers, consider "next steps."

On January 9, 2023, Quebec's prosecution office le Directeur des poursuites criminelles et pénales (DPCP) publicly confirmed they would not contest the decision of Judge Richard Meredith, saying "the prosecution cannot appeal on a question of fact."

Related proceedings 
On June 14, 2021, Fortin filed a request for judicial review of the decision to remove him from his PHAC role, seeking either reinstatement or assignment to another position suitable for his rank. Fortin argued that the decision to remove him was political and that he was denied procedural fairness. The Federal Court ruled against him later that year, finding that the military grievance process as the proper venue. Fortin appealed the decision to the Federal Court of Appeal.

After the trial decision, the military launched its own internal review. On January 23, 2023, an internal review led by Vice-Admiral Bob Auchterlonie concluded that on the balance of probabilities Fortin did not engage in sexual misconduct, so no further administrative measures were required.

On March 15, 2023, Fortin sued the federal government, and sixteen individuals, including Prime Minister Justin Trudeau, as well as leading military and political figures including chief of the defence staff General Wayne Eyre, then-minister of health Patty Hajdu, then-minister of defence Harjit Sajjan, and then-head of defence public affairs Laurie-Anne Kempton for $6 million in damages for alleged defamation, misfeasance in public office, conspiracy and negligent investigation.

Honours

 He also wears the Canadian Forces Jump Wings With Red Maple Leaf.

References 

Canadian Army officers
Canadian generals
People from Montmagny, Quebec
Living people
Year of birth missing (living people)